Radomierzyce may refer to the following places in Lower Silesian Voivodeship, Poland:
Radomierzyce, Wrocław County
Radomierzyce, Zgorzelec County